Jackson Mendes da Silva (born 4 January 1991) is a French professional footballer who currently plays as a forward for RC Grasse.

References
 
 
 Jackson Mendes profile at foot-national.com
 

1991 births
Living people
People from Grasse
French sportspeople of Cape Verdean descent
French footballers
Association football forwards
AS Monaco FC players
AC Arlésien players
CA Bastia players
Lyon La Duchère players
RC Grasse players
Ligue 2 players
Championnat National players
Championnat National 2 players
Championnat National 3 players
Sportspeople from Alpes-Maritimes
Footballers from Provence-Alpes-Côte d'Azur